Manudevi Temple is located near Adgaon village in Yawal Taluka, in Jalgaon district in the scenic natural surroundings of the Satpura Range, Maharashtra, India. Manudevi is the kuldevi of 70% of the people in Jalgaon district.

The front of the temple features a waterfall and is surrounded by hills on three sides and makes a popular picnic spot. School children and college students are frequent visitors.

The temple also features a man made lake nearby.

Manudevi near Bormaal

Also, a famous Manudevi Temple is there in Bormal Hills in Aurangabad District of Maharashtra.

Manudevi is worshipped by most of Khandeshi and nearby people. The Goddess is believed to be Kuldevata of many families including the Baviskar Family. Baviskar has recently reconstructed the temple, a destination for pilgrims and tourists.

Villagers celebrate the festival of Navratri at Bormaal and also arrange small fairs with devotees visiting temples for nine days.

External links
 www.manudevi.com

Hindu temples in Maharashtra
Tourist attractions in Jalgaon district